The triennial Senate Elections of Pakistan were held on 3 March 2018 to replace 52 retiring senators - half of the Senate's strength - with the winning candidates serving six-year terms. Overall, Pakistan Muslim League (N) came out as the largest party, followed by the Pakistan Peoples Party and the Pakistan Tehreek-e-Insaf. The results of these elections were steeped in controversy due to rampant allegations of horse trading and vote-buying, which lead to the Prime Minister and opposition leader Imran Khan calling for reforms. Prior to this election, PML (N) candidates were declared as independents by the Election Commission of Pakistan owing to a Supreme Court judgment.

Elections for the chairmanship and deputy chairmanship of the senate were held on 12 March 2018. Both posts were won by joint opposition's candidates with Sadiq Sanjrani and Saleem Mandviwalla being elected chairman and deputy chairman, respectively.

Background
The Senate of Pakistan is the upper house of the Parliament of Pakistan. It consists of 104 senators with each senator serving a 6-year term. The elections are conducted triennially for half the seats in the senate. This staggered nature of the terms means that at any given time senators from two different elections are serving in the Senate.

The 2018 elections were conducted on 3 March 2018 to replace the senators elected during the 2012 elections. The electoral process is based on an indirect single transferable vote. This is in contrast to the methodology of direct first-past-the-post voting used in all other parliamentary elections in the country. Thus, effectively, the senators in Pakistan are voted for by serving members of the country's National and Provincial Assemblies and not the public. This reduction in electorate, the transferable nature of the vote, and secrecy of the ballot have resulted in the senate elections in the country being almost always marred by allegations of vote trading.

In terms of seats, there is fixed representation of each of the country's administrative unit in the senate, apart from the disputed territories of Gilgit-Baltistan and Azad Kashmir. There are 23 seats from each province, 8 from Federally Administered Tribal Areas, and 4 from the capital region of Islamabad. In a given election, half of these seats are contested for. Due to the odd nature of the number of seats from the provinces, each election cycle sees two provinces elect all 12 representatives, while the remaining two elect 11.

This year's elections took place in an environment of uncertainty as one of the electing houses, the Balochistan Assembly, saw an in-house change, the lower house's speaker, Ayaz Sadiq, voiced concerns that 'hidden elements' might not let the current government complete its term, and the candidacy of PML-N candidates was stripped mere days before the election. Further still, in the lead up to the elections, the ruling PML-N was of the opinion that the provincial assemblies in which it is not in power, namely, Balochistan, Sindh, and Khyber Pakhtunkhwa, might be prematurely dissolved to postpone the senate elections until after the general elections.

Candidacy of PML-N Nominees
On 28 July 2017, the Supreme Court of Pakistan disqualified Prime Minister Nawaz Sharif from holding public office. Following this, the Elections Act 2017 was passed, which allowed Sharif to serve as party head despite being disqualified. However, in a later judgement passed by the Supreme Court on 21 February 2018, Sharif was disqualified from holding office as party president. In this judgement, all decisions taken by Sharif during his tenure as party president were declared null and void, including Senate tickets which he had signed himself. To prevent delay in Senate elections, the Election Commission of Pakistan declared all PML(N) candidates as Independents.

Voting
Voting is conducted on the basis of single transferable vote where a voter prioritizes their vote among a list of candidates. First priority votes are given the highest weightage and carry 100 points. Election Commission of Pakistan establishes the criteria for the minimum number of points required to attain a senate seat. During the first count, when a candidate breaches that criteria, they are declared a winner for the seat. Any surplus points they have are divided among other preferences in successive iteration(s). Similarly, a candidate who falls well short of this criteria during the first count has their points transferred among other preferences in subsequent count(s). This whole exercise is repeated iteratively until all vacant seats are filled.

It is pertinent to mention that the points system is only used for senators to be elected from general, women, and technocrat seats in provincial assemblies. For senators who are elected from the National Assembly or are running for a minority/non-Muslim seat in the provinces, only a vote count is used.

In a typical election, a total of 52 seats are contested. Of which 33 are general seats (7 from each province, 4 from FATA, and 1 from Islamabad), 9 are technocrat seats (2 from each province, and 1 from Islamabad), 8 are women seats (2 apiece from each province), and 2 are minority seats (1 each from 2 provinces).

Voting Requirements

The following table outlines the voting requirements in the current senate elections. The Minimum Votes Required column only considers first priority votes:

†Only members from FATA are eligible to vote.

‡Minority Seats are filled for only 2 provinces in a given election. This way the elections for these seats alternate between Punjab/Sindh and Balochistan/KPK.

Candidates
A total of 131 candidates were in the run for the 52 seats. 33 from Sindh, 26 from Khyber Pakhtunkhwa, 24 from FATA, 23 from Balochistan, 20 from Punjab, and 5 from Islamabad.

Candidates by Administrative Unit

Results

Summary 
Overall, PML (N) backed Independents won the most seats, securing 15 of the 52 seats up for election. 11 of these seats were from Punjab, 2 of them from Islamabad and 2 from Khyber Pakhtunkhwa. The Pakistan Peoples Party (PPP) closely trailed behind, securing 12 of the 52 seats. Of these, 10 were won in Sindh and 2 were won in Khyber Pakhtunkhwa. Meanwhile, Pakistan Tehreek-e-Insaf (PTI) secured 6 seats of which 5 came from Khyber Pakhtunkhwa and one from Punjab.

The strong performance of the PPP raised many eyebrows and led to allegations of 'horse trading' by the party. Noting that MQM, despite having 52 MPAs in the Sindh Assembly, only managed to secure one senator, whilst the PPP managed to secure two senators - including one on the women's seat - from Khyber Pakhtunkhwa with only 7 MPAs.

Another surprise win was by Chaudhry Sarwar of Pakistan Tehreek-e-Insaf from a general seat in Punjab who gained 44 first priority and 2 second priority votes - the most in the assembly this election. This was a surprise because the result came about despite the PTI-PML (Q) alliance only having 38 votes. This indicated that Sarwar had also been voted for by members of Pakistan Muslim League (N) and Pakistan Peoples Party.

Finally, on a Women seat from Sindh, Krishna Kolhi of the PPP became the first Dalit to be elected to the Senate of Pakistan.

Results by Administrative Units 
NOTE: All PML-N candidates officially ran as Independents

Provinces

Federally Administered Units 
NOTE: FATA only has general seats, while Islamabad has 1 general and 1 technocrat seat that were up in this election.

Election of Chairman and Deputy Chairman
After the winning candidates have been notified by the Election Commission, there is a one-week delay until they take oath. During that time, retiring senators make their farewell speeches and any objections on the successful candidates is handled. After this time has lapsed, the reconstituted senate elects their Chairman and Deputy Chairman by a simple majority via a secret ballot.

Candidates and Results
Two candidates apiece, from the opposition and treasury benches, contested the elections on 12 March 2018. Joint opposition's candidates, Sadiq Sanjrani and Saleem Mandviwalla, won the elections for their respective seats.

References

Senate
Senate election
Senate elections in Pakistan